Kells Lower (or Lower Kells) is a barony in County Meath, Ireland.

Location

Kells Lower lies to the north of the town of Kells, County Meath, and to the east of Lough Ramor.
It contains ten civil parishes: Cruicetown, Emlagh, Enniskeen, Kilbeg, Kilmainham, Moybolgue, Moynalty, Newtown, Nobber and Staholmog.
The earliest record of the place, in the form Cenondas, is from 690 in the Life of St. Patrick preserved in the Book of Armagh.

1846 description

The 1846 Parliamentary Gazetteer of Ireland said,

As of 1846 the population was 13,666.
2,109 families were mainly engaged in agriculture, 319 in manufacture and trade, and 134 in other occupations.
Of males at or above the age of five, 2,458 could read and write, 1,955 could read but not write and 1,055 could neither read nor write.
Of females at or above the age of five, 776 could read and write, 1,163 could read but not write and 4,410 could neither read nor write.

Notes

Sources

Baronies of County Meath